Choristhemis is a genus of small dragonflies in the family Synthemistidae 
found in eastern Australia.
They are small to medium-sized slender dragonflies with dark colouring and light markings and a relatively weak flight.

Species
The genus includes two species:
Choristhemis flavoterminata  – yellow-tipped tigertail
Choristhemis olivei  – delicate tigertail

References

Synthemistidae
Anisoptera genera
Odonata of Australia
Endemic fauna of Australia
Taxa named by Robert John Tillyard
Insects described in 1910